The second season of the 2008 American Gladiators revival premiered on April 12, 2008 and concluded on August 4 of the same year, airing on NBC in the United States and Citytv in Canada.

Format
Season 2 of the revival featured 40 contenders (20 male, 20 female) as opposed to the first season featuring 24 (12 male, 12 female). Men and women compete in separate tournaments, with two men and two women competing in each episode. In each episode, contenders take part in several events against the Gladiators, trying to earn as many points as possible before the final event, the Eliminator. Each point separating the contenders translates into a half-second advantage for the leader (or a half-second handicap for the trailing contender). Preliminary round matches consisted of six events plus the Eliminator (by comparison, the original series had either six or seven events plus the Eliminator). However, during the two-hour season premiere, the contenders only participated in four events before competing in the Eliminator in both heats.

The six male contenders and the six female contenders who won their respective preliminary matches with the fastest Eliminator times advanced to the semifinals. Unlike the first season, there are now three semifinal rounds, and only the two winning male and two winning female contenders with the fastest Eliminator times qualify for the finals.

The grand prize was $100,000, a 2008 Toyota Sequoia, and the right to become a Gladiator for Season 3.

Gladiators

Returning Gladiators

New Gladiators

Reserves

Contenders

Female contenders

Male contenders

Events

Returning Events

Assault
In Assault, the turret for the second station no longer moves side to side, and a bazooka was added for the third station. Contenders no longer have to fish in the sand for an arrow or load any of the weapons with the exception of the slingshot.  If a ball fired by the gladiator bounces off the floor before hitting the contender, the hit does not count.

Earthquake
In Earthquake, the contender and Gladiator wrestle on a  platform that is suspended above the pool, rather than over the floor as in the first season. If the Contender takes the Gladiator off the platform, he or she is declared the winner, even if he or she also comes down in the process. A Contender gets 10 points if he or she pulls the Gladiator down, and 5 points if he or she lasts the entire 30 seconds. Holding on to the wires supporting the Earthquake ring is legal, but kicking or otherwise using the foot to remove the Contender from the ring is not. The event is similar in concept to the "Conquer", part of the "Breakthrough and Conquer" event from the original series.

Gauntlet
In the quarterfinals, the rules of Gauntlet remained largely the same as the first season. However, during the semifinals, the rules reverted to ones similar to those used in the original US version: contenders earn 10 points for completing the Gauntlet in under 20 seconds, or 5 for doing so within the 30-second limit.

Hang Tough
The rules for Hang Tough are largely the same as in the first season, except the course has been lengthened and the scoring rings are blue instead of red.

Hit & Run
Hit & Run remains largely the same as in the first season.

Joust
Joust remains largely the same as in the first season.

Powerball
In Powerball, caps have been added to the scoring pods to narrow the opening and prevent the contenders from scoring by shooting the ball and the course has been enlarged. Points scored from in outer pods are now worth one point rather than two and points scored in the inner pod are now worth two points rather than three.

Pyramid
Pyramid remains largely the same as in the first season.

The Wall
In The Wall, the height of the wall was raised to 50 feet, and each contender raced up a separate wall. Contenders and Gladiators cross floating platforms to reach the Wall (the same platforms were used at the beginning of the Eliminator in Season 1). Once the Gladiators begin their pursuit, the platforms are retracted. Contenders that are pulled or fall from the Wall drop into the water. Unlike previous editions, however, contenders earn 5 points if they are still on the Wall when the 60-second time limit expires.

New Events

Rocketball
In Rocketball, two Gladiators and two contenders begin the match at the corners of the arena. When each competitor presses a button, they are launched via their harnesses into the air toward two goals at the center of the arena. The contenders try to score by throwing balls into the goals, while the Gladiators play defense. Goals in the lower basket are worth 1 point, while goals in the upper basket are worth 2. The event is similar to an inverted version of the original series event Swingshot.

Sideswipe
Sideswipe features a series of five platforms, similar in size to those used in Joust. Each end platform has a "bullseye" target, and colored balls attached to the base. The contenders have 60 seconds to pull a ball off one platform, race across the five platforms, and place the ball in the target at the other end; each ball placed in the target earns one point. As in Hit and Run, the Gladiators try to end the event early by knocking the contender into the water. In Sideswipe, though, the Gladiators themselves are the projectiles, swinging on ropes to try to hit the contender.

Skytrack
The 2008 revival uses the UK rules of Skytrack. The two contenders race around one lap suspended upside down from a figure 8 track hanging from the ceiling of the arena. They are chased by two Gladiators, whose goal is to pull a ripcord being trailed by the Contenders. If the Gladiator pulls the ripcord, the contender is released from their carriage and is eliminated from the race. The first contender to cross the finish line earns 10 points whereas the second contender to do so earns 5 points. The contenders also face a time limit of 60 seconds. The Gladiators start further away from the contenders so they can have a fair match.

Snapback
The 2008 version of Snapback is very different from the event of the same name in the original series. In the new version, each contender is connected by a bungee cord to a Gladiator, who stands on a platform behind a 50-foot-long lane. The contenders race toward red buttons at the end of their lanes while the Gladiators resist by pulling back on their bungee lines. Contenders can earn 2, 4, 6, or 8 points based on their progress down the lane when time expires. If they reach the red button at the end of their lane, they earn 10 points and launch their Gladiator into the air (but not into the pool, as in Assault); both contenders can earn 10 points.

Tilt
The rules of Tilt, which is originally from the UK version, are similar to Tug-O-War from the original run of American Gladiators. The Contender and Gladiator begin each match on a platform situated above the pool. The Gladiator's platform is higher than the contender's and is tilted forward. The Contender's platform is tilted backwards to start the match.  5 points are awarded if the Contender can remain on the platform for the entire 30 seconds. The Contender can earn 10 points if they can pull the Gladiator off the platform and into the water. The rope is attached to both Contender and Gladiator by a harness, which removes the possibility of losing by letting go of the rope.

Vertigo
In Vertigo, which was first introduced in the UK version, the contender and Gladiator race across a course of seven flexible poles with handholds and platforms. The game begins with both competitors racing up a laddered pole. Upon reaching the top, they must then sway their pole towards the next, crossing onto it. The winner is the first to complete the course, grabbing a large hoop at the end to return to the ground. Contenders earn 10 points if they beat the Gladiator, or 5 if they reach the scoring zone (the fifth pole or beyond) if the Gladiator wins.

Atlasphere
The return of Atlasphere, last seen in Season 5 of the original series (1993–94), includes elements from the original series. The competitors begin on ramps, as in Seasons 3 and 4 of the original series, and each contender must roll his/her sphere directly over the sensors in the middle of the pod to release a blast of steam and score 2 points.

The Eliminator
In season 2 the Eliminator had these tasks
Jump directly into the pool and swim under the fiery surface.
Climb up a cargo net.
Rope swing downward.
Tightrope walk downward.
Use a Hand bike to cross over a 6 ft deep ball pit.
Run across a spinning barrel.
Climb the Pyramid.
Travel down a zipline.
Cross a teeter-totter.
Run up the Travelator.
Climb a short flight of stairs.
Rope swing through a banner into the pool.

Quarterfinals

Females
Heat 1

Heat 2

Heat 3

Heat 4

Heat 5

Heat 6

Heat 7

Heat 8

Heat 9

Heat 10

Eliminator Times

Males
Heat 1

Heat 2

Heat 3

Heat 4

Heat 5

Heat 6

Heat 7

Heat 8

Heat 9

Heat 10

Eliminator Times

Semifinals

Females
Heat 1

Heat 2

Heat 3

Eliminator Times

Males
Heat 1

Heat 2

Heat 3

Eliminator Times

Finals

Females

Eliminator Times

Males

Eliminator Times

Elimination Table
Females

Males

Special episodes

Season 2 featured a number of "theme" episodes. These episodes were not stand-alone episodes.

Episode 2: Both competitions featured cops who work together: Melvin Davis and David Moore work in the Chicago Police Department, while Abbe Dorn and Vicki Ferrari are partners working in Denver.

Episode 4: This episode was dedicated to the movie The Incredible Hulk. Special Hulk themed elements to the show included: green lighting in the rafters and the pool; the use of green scoring balls in Powerball (one contender used solid green balls, the other used green and black balls); Gauntlet power pads being replaced by "Hulk Hands"; and Titan competing in Joust covered in green body paint. Lou Ferrigno, who portrayed the Incredible Hulk on the 1978 TV series, was in the audience for this episode.

Episode 5: Twin sisters Clinessa Burch and Lillian Thomassen competed against one another.

Episode 6: Two married couples—Jeff and Ally Davidson, and Aaron Simpson and Kendra Sirignano—competed (individually).

Episode 7: All four contestants had lost 50 or more pounds prior to competing on the show.

Episode 9: The female competition was called "The Battle of the Ages" as it pitted the youngest contender of the season, Annie Castellano, age 20, against the oldest contender ever on the show, Yoko Ohigashi, age 52.

References

Gladiators (franchise)
2008 American television seasons